Phosphophyllite (and phosphate) is a rare mineral with the chemical formula , composed of hydrated zinc phosphate.  It is highly prized by collectors for its rarity and for its delicate bluish green colour. Phosphophyllite is rarely cut because it is fragile and brittle, and large crystals are too valuable to be broken up.

The finest phosphophyllite crystals come from Potosí, Bolivia, but it is no longer mined there. Other sources include New Hampshire, United States and Hagendorf, Bavaria, Germany. It is often found in association with the minerals chalcopyrite and triphylite.

Phosphophyllite has been synthesized synthetically by the addition of diammonium phosphate to a solution of zinc and iron sulfate.

Popular Culture
A personified phosphophyllite crystal named Phos is featured as the protagonist of Land of the Lustrous, a manga and anime series from Japan, where they live alongside other gems. The attributes of the gem such as its softness and color play a key role in defining the personality and weaknesses of the character.

References

Zinc minerals
Iron(II) minerals
Phosphate minerals
Luminescent minerals
Monoclinic minerals
Minerals in space group 14